Mogollon culture is an archaeological culture of Native American peoples from Southern New Mexico and Arizona, Northern Sonora and Chihuahua, and Western Texas. The northern part of this region is Oasisamerica, while the southern span of the Mogollon culture is known as Aridoamerica.

The Mogollon culture is one of the major prehistoric Southwestern cultural divisions of the Southwestern United States and Northern Mexico. The culture flourished from the archaic period, to either 1450 or 1540 CE, when the Spanish arrived.

Etymology

The name Mogollon comes from the Mogollon Mountains, which were named after Don Juan Ignacio Flores Mogollón, Spanish Governor of New Spain (including what is now New Mexico) from 1712 to 1715. The name was chosen and defined in 1936 by archaeologist Emil W. Haury.

Cultural traits
 
The distinct facets of Mogollon culture were recorded by Emil Haury, based on his excavations in 1931, 1933, and 1934 at the Harris Village in Mimbres, New Mexico, and the Mogollon Village on the upper San Francisco River in New Mexico Haury recognized differences between architecture and artifacts from these sites as compared with sites in the Hohokam archaeological culture area and the Ancestral Pueblo archaeological culture area. Key differences included brown-paste, coil-and-scrape pottery, deeply excavated semi-subterranean pit-houses and different ceremonial architecture. Eight decades of subsequent research have confirmed Haury's initial findings. Today, the distinctiveness of the Mogollon pottery manufacture, architectural construction, ground-stone tool design, habits and customs of residence location, and mortuary treatment is generally recognized.

The earliest Mogollon pithouses were deep and either circular or oval-shaped. Over time, Mogollon people built rectangular houses with rounded corners with them not as deep. Their villages also had kivas, or round, semi-subterranean ceremonial structures.

History

Mogollon origins remain a matter of speculation. One theory is that the Mogollon emerged from a Desert Archaic tradition linked to the first (late Pleistocene) prehistoric human occupations of the area (around 9000 BC). In this theory, cultural distinctions emerged in the larger region when populations grew enough to establish villages and larger communities. An alternative theory is that the Mogollon descended from migrants from farming regions in central Mexico around 3500 BC, and displaced descendants of the Desert Archaic peoples. A third theory is that Mogollon descended from the Cochise culture (the early pithouse, late Desert Archaic) who had arrived around 5000 BC, and were not linked to the earlier inhabitants, but adopted farming from Central Mexico.

Initially, the Mogollon were foragers who augmented their subsistence by farming. But during the first millennium CE, dependence on farming probably increased. Water control features are common among Mimbres branch sites from the 10th through 12th centuries CE.

The nature and density of Mogollon villages changed over time. The earliest villages consist of several pithouses -- houses dug into the ground, with stick and thatch roofs supported by a network of posts and beams, and faced on the exterior with earth. Villages grew and by the 11th century surface pueblos became common. They had ground-level houses with walls of rock and earth and roofs supported by post and beam networks. In the 13th and 14th centuries, cliff-dwellings became common.

Research on Mogollon culture has led to the recognition of regional variants, of which the most widely recognized in popular media is the Mimbres culture (Mimbres Mogollon branch). Others include the Jornada, Forestdale, Reserve, Point of Pines (or "Black River"), San Simon, and Upper Gila branches. Although the Mimbres culture is the best-known subset of the Mogollon archaeological culture-area, the entire Mogollon occupation spans a greater interval of time (roughly one millennium) and a vastly larger area than is encompassed by the Mimbres culture.

Developmental periods

Mogollon culture is often divided into five periods proposed by Joe Ben Wheat in 1955:
 Mogollon 1 (200 – c. 400 CE): Pine Lawn, Georgetown, Penasco, Circle Prairie, and Hilltop phases
 Mogollon 2 (c. 400–650 CE): San Lorenzo, Dos Cabezas, Circle Prairie, and Cottonwood phases
 Mogollon 3 (650–850 CE): San Francisco, Pinaleno, Galiuro, Forestdale, and San Marcial phases
 Mogollon 4 (850–1000 CE): Three Circle, Cerros, Corduroy, Mesilla, and Capitan phases
 Mogollon 5 (1000–1450 CE), including the Classic Mimbres phrase (1050–1200 CE): Mangus, Mimbres, Encinas, Reserve, Tularosa, Dona Anna, Three Rivers, El Paso, and San Anders phases.

Another way to divide Mogollon history is in three periods of housing types:
 Early Pithouse (200–550 CE)
 Late Pithouse (550–1000 CE)
 Mogollon Pueblo (1000–1450 CE).

Sites
Archaeological sites attributed to the Mogollon culture are found in the Gila Wilderness, Mimbres River Valley, along the Upper Gila river, Paquime and Hueco Tanks, an area of low mountains between the Franklin Mountains to the west and the Hueco Mountains to the east. Gila Cliff Dwellings National Monument in southwestern New Mexico was established as a national monument on 16 November 1907. It contains several archaeological sites attributed to the Mimbres branch. At the headwaters of the Gila, Mimbres populations adjoined another more northern branch of the Mogollon culture. The TJ Ruin, for example, is a Classic Mimbres phase pueblo, however the cliff dwellings are Tularosa phase.

Mimbres branch

Mimbres may, depending on its context, refer to a tradition within a subregion of the Mogollon culture area (the Mimbres branch or the Mimbres Mogollon) or to an interval of time, the "Classic Mimbres phase" (also known as the "Mimbres culture"; 1000–1130 CE, roughly) within the Mimbres branch.

The Mimbres branch is a subset of the larger Mogollon culture area, centered in the Mimbres Valley and encompassing the upper Gila River and parts of the upper San Francisco River in southwestern New Mexico and southeastern Arizona as well as the Rio Grande Valley and its western tributaries in southwest New Mexico. Differentiation between the Mimbres branch and other areas of the Mogollon culture area is most apparent during the Three Circle (825–1000 CE roughly) and Classic Mimbres (1000–1150) phases, when architectural construction and black and white painted pottery assume locally distinctive forms and styles. Classic Mimbres phase pottery is particularly famous pottery, and Classic Mimbres pottery designs (mainly drawn from the Swarts Ruin excavations of 1924–1927) were imitated on Santa Fe Railroad "Mimbreños" china dinnerware from 1936 to 1970.

Three Circle phase (825/850–1000) pithouse villages within the Mimbres branch are distinctive. Local pottery styles include early forms of Mimbres black and white ("boldface"), red-on-cream, and textured plainware. Large ceremonial structures (often called "kivas") are dug deeply into the ground and often include distinctive ceremonial features such as foot drums and log grooves.

Classic Mimbres phase (AD 1000–1130) pueblos can be quite large, with some composed of clusters of communities, each containing up to 150 rooms and all grouped around an open plaza. Ceremonial structures were different from the previous pithouse periods. Most common were ceremonial rooms within roomblocks. Smaller square or rectangular semi-subterranean kivas with roof openings are also found. (The word "kiva", a Hopi term with specific meaning, has generally been applied to Northern Pueblo populations. It may be a poor term in discussing the Mogollon in their broadest contexts.) The largest Classic Mimbres sites are located near wide areas of well-watered floodplain suitable for maize agriculture, although smaller villages exist in upland areas.

Mimbres pottery

Ceramics, especially bowls, produced in the Mimbres region are distinct in style and painted with geometric designs and representational images of animals, people, and cultural icons in black paint on a white background. Some of these images suggest familiarity and relationships with cultures in northern and central Mexico. The elaborate decoration suggests the Mimbres Mogollons enjoyed a rich ceremonial life. Early Mimbres black-on-white pottery, called Mimbres Style I (formerly "Boldface Black-on-White"), is primarily characterized by bold geometric designs, although some early examples feature human and animal figures.

Both geometric and figurative designs grew increasingly sophisticated and diverse over time. Classic Mimbres Black-on-White pottery (Style III) is characterized by elaborate geometric designs, refined brushwork, including very fine linework, and may include figures of one or more animals, humans, or other images bounded either by simple rim bands or by geometric decoration. Bird figures are common on Mimbres pots, including images such as turkeys feeding on insects and a man trapping birds in a garden. Fish figures are also depicted on Mimbres pottery, and some are marine species typically found in the Gulf of California.

Mimbres bowls are often found associated with burials, typically with a hole punched out of the center, known as kill holes. Bowls with kill holes have been commonly found covering the face of the interred person. However, archaeological evidence suggests that most potteries were not buried with the dead. Wear marks on the insides of bowls show they were actually used, not just produced as burial items. The distinctive style, which includes "diamond-shaped eyes and receding chins for human figures", created demand on the black market beginning in the 1960s, and vandalism and looting of gravesite took pace and has continued into the present day.

Mimbres pottery is so distinctive that until fairly recently, the end of its production around 1130 to 1150 was equated with the "disappearance" of the people who made it. More recent research indicates that substantial depopulation did occur in the Mimbres Valley, but some remnant populations persisted there. Both there and in surrounding areas, people changed their pottery styles to more closely resemble those of neighboring culture areas, and dispersed into other residential sites with different types of architecture.

Descendants
The area originally settled by the Mogollon culture was eventually filled by the unrelated Apache people, who moved in from the north. However, contemporary Pueblo people in the southwest claim descent from the Mogollon and other related cultures. Archaeologists believe that the Western Pueblo villages of the Hopi and Zuni people are potentially related to the Mogollon. Ceramics traditions and oral history link the Acoma, Hopi, and Zuni, to the Mogollon.

See also

 List of dwellings of Pueblo peoples
 La Junta Indians
 Mogollon Rim
 Patayan
 Prehistoric Southwestern cultural divisions
 Swarts Ruin
 Cuarenta Casas
 Casas Grandes, or Paquimé, Chihuahua
 Gila Cliff Dwellings National Monument
 Kinishba Ruins, a National Historic Landmark in the Fort Apache Indian Reservation

Notes

References
 Alfredo López Austin and Leonardo López Luján. Mexico’s Indigenous Past. Norman: University of Oklahoma Press, 2005. .
 Fewkes, J. Walter. The Mimbres: Art and Archaeology. Avanyu Publishing, Albuquerque, New Mexico, republished 1993. .
 Brody, J. J., Steven Le Blanc, and Catherine J. Scott. Mimbres Pottery: Ancient Art of the American Southwest: Essays. New York: Hudson Hills, 1983. .
 Noble, David Grant.  Ancient Ruins of the Southwest. Northland Publishing Company, Flagstaff, Arizona, 1995. .
 Powell-Marti, Valli S., and Patricia A. Gilman. Mimbres Society. University of Arizona Press, Tucson, 2006.
 Plog, Stephen. Ancient Peoples of the American Southwest. Thames and Hudson, London, England, 1997. .
 Skibo, James M., Michael W. Graves, Miriam T. Stark. Archaeological Anthropology: Perspectives on Method and Theory. Tucson: University of Arizona Press, 2007. .
 Woosley, Anne I., and Allan J. McIntyre. Mimbres Mogollon Archaeology: Charles C. Di Peso's Excavations at Wind Mountain. University of New Mexico Press, 1996.

Further reading
 Brody, J. J. Mimbres Painted Pottery: Ancient Art of the American Southwest. Santa Fe, NM: School of American Research Press, 2005. .
 Diehl, Michael W., and Steven A. LeBlanc. Early Pithouse Villages of the Mimbres Valley and Beyond: The McAnally and Thompson Sites in their Cultural and Ecological Contexts. Papers No. 83. Peabody Museum of Archaeology and Ethnology, Harvard University, Cambridge, Massachusetts 2001. .
 Reid, Jefferson and Stephanie M. Whittlesey. Prehistory, Personality, and Place: Emil W. Haury and the Mogollon Controversy (Tucson: University of Arizona Press, 2010). Examines the controversy occasioned by the American archaeologist's identification of the Mogollon as a people distinct from their Pueblo and Hohokam neighbors.
 Shafer, Harry J. Mimbres Archaeology at the NAN Ranch Ruin. Albuquerque: University of New Mexico Press, 2004. .

External links

 People of the Colorado Plateau
 Firecracker Pueblo, a Jornada Mogollon pueblo in West Texas
 Mogollan artwork, collection of the National Museum of the American Indian
 Mimbres Pottery at the Weisman Art Museum
 Mimbres pottery at Arizona State University

 
Archaeological cultures of North America
Indigenous peoples in Mexico
Indigenous peoples of Aridoamerica
Native American history of New Mexico
Native American history of Arizona
Mogollon Rim